I Want to Live is a 2018 Lithuanian drama film directed by Justinas Krisiūnas.

Cast
 Rolandas Kazlas - Mentor Andrius
 Indrė Patkauskaitė - Nurse Gabija
 Liubomiras Laucevičius - Sanatorium director
  - Snapas

References

External links 
 

2018 drama films
Lithuanian drama films
Lithuanian-language films